Danger Bay is a Canadian television series, produced in Vancouver, with first-run episodes broadcast on CBC Television in Canada and The Disney Channel in the United States premiering October 8, 1984. Reruns of the show continued on The Disney Channel until 1996. A total of 123 installments were filmed between 1984 and 1990. The series was perceived as wholesome, exciting fare for older children and adolescents, and continued to be seen through the 1990s in many countries worldwide.

The series followed the exploits of the Roberts family: marine veterinarian Grant "Doc" Roberts and his children, Nicole and Jonah. Nearly every 30-minute episode featured the Vancouver Aquarium. Most episodes focused on environmental issues such as pollution, wildlife endangerment, and forest preservation.

The series was also broadcast in 68 countries such as Gibraltar (Danger Bay), Bulgaria (Опасният Залив), Ukraine (Затока Небезпеки), Poland (Niebezpieczna zatoka), Czechoslovakia (Nebezpečný záliv, with Slovak dubbing), Iceland (Háskaslóðir, subtitled on state TV channel RUV), Cuba (Bahía Peligro), Trinidad & Tobago, Estonia (Ohtude Laht, subtitled), Finland (Vaarojen Lahti, subtitled), Sweden (Äventyr i bukten, subtitled on state TV), Germany (Abenteuer in Vancouver), The Netherlands (Dutch subtitles), Belgium (Avonturenbaai), Iran (گارد ساحلی), Iraq (ساحل المخاطر), France (Cap Danger) South Africa (Danger Bay), India (Danger Bay), Spain (Bahía Peligrosa), North Macedonia (Опасниот Залив) and in Venezuela (Bahía Peligro) for television channel Televen.

Cast 
 Donnelly Rhodes as Dr. Grant "Doc" Roberts
 Susan Walden as J. L. Duval
 Christopher Crabb as Jonah Roberts
 Ocean Hellman as Nicole Roberts
 Hagan Beggs as Dr. George Dunbar
 Michele B. Chan as Dr. Donna Chen
 Deborah Wakeham as Joyce Carter

Episodes

Streaming

As of 2018 the Entire series has been released online on the Canada Media Fund's Encore+ YouTube channel.

References

External links 

 
 Danger Bay Yahoo! Group 

1984 Canadian television series debuts
1990 Canadian television series endings
CBC Television original programming
Disney Channel original programming
Television shows filmed in Vancouver
Television shows set in Vancouver
1980s Canadian drama television series
1990s Canadian drama television series
Environmental television
Nautical television series